Kalyani Gajapati or Kalyani Devi is the current head of the Parlakhemundi Ganga dynasty. She became the first woman to head the Ganga dynasty of  Paralakhemundi.

Life 
Kalyani Gajapati spent her early years away from Paralakhemundi as she pursued her education in Bangalore and Chennai visited the palace occasionally.

Kalyani Gajapati was crowned at age 50 on 10 January 2020, after her father Gopinath Gajapati Narayan Deo died in Bhubaneswar. She is the 17th head of the dynasty. A puja was performed at Ramaswami temple near the palace. Kalyani was taken in a procession to the Darbar Hall or her court, where she sat on the throne in the attire of a princess. After coronation, Kalyani issued her first order: the funeral and cremation of her father.

Kalyani Gajapati joined the political party BJD (Biju Janata Dal) in February 2019.

See also
 Parlakhemundi Ganga dynasty
 Gopinath Gajapati Narayan Deo
 Gajapati Palace
 Eastern ganga dynasty

References

Living people
People from Paralakhemundi
21st-century women rulers
21st-century Indian women politicians
Year of birth missing (living people)